Justin Daniel Rossetti (born November 12, 1981)  is an American politician of the who served as a member of the Washington House of Representatives, representing the 19th district from 2015 to 2016. A member of the Democratic Party, Rossetti was appointed to the state legislature on October 22, 2015 in the 19th Legislative District. JD Rossetti filled the vacancy left after then-State Representative Dean Takko was appointed to the Washington State Senate, after State Senator Brian Hatfield had resigned to take the position of Sector Lead for Rural Economic Development in Governor Inslee's administration. Rossetti was elected in 2013 as a Director on Longview School District's Board of Education.

Rossetti retired from the Longview School Board and in 2017 and was succeeded by Phil Jumru.

The Speaker of the House has appointed Rossetti to the Community Economic Revitalization Board, which helps local governments and tribes fund projects that create jobs. Those projects include broadband access, water lines, stormwater systems, port facilities and other public structures that support economic growth.

Legislative proposals
Rossetti has introduced numerous legislative proposals as a leader in advocacy on Capitol Hill and in Western State Legislatures. Some legislative proposals introduced by JD Rossetti include:

House Bill 2847 - Disability Retrofitting
House Bill 2651 – Concerning Vehicle Maximum gross weights
House Bill 2725 – Pharmacist Authority
House Bill 2296 - Concerning the taxing authority of public facilities districts
House Bill 2446 – Concerning citizens participating in workgroups

Published articles
Rossetti has also published numerous articles. Some of them include:

Let’s give working families—not Wall Street—a tax break. The Daily News.
A great education for all of our kids. Camas Post Record.
It’s time to revitalize FDR’s Four Freedoms
Homelessness hurts us all — but we can do something. Camas Post Record.
Separate is not equal. The Daily News.

References

External links
Official website
Personal website

1981 births
Living people
Democratic Party members of the Washington House of Representatives
Washington State University alumni
Politicians from Hillsboro, Oregon
People from Longview, Washington
21st-century American politicians